Avdeyevo is a rural locality (a village) in Zaraysky District, Moscow Oblast, Russia. The population was 977 as of 2010.

Geography 
Avdeyevo is located 14 km south of Zaraysk (the district's administrative centre) by road. Berezniki is the nearest rural locality.

References 

Rural localities in Zaraysky District, Moscow Oblast